Bolivia recognised a first same-sex civil union on 9 December 2020. As of January 2023, 16 same-sex couples have managed to officially register their union. The Constitution of Bolivia does not recognize same-sex marriages, though a ruling issued by the Inter-American Court of Human Rights places a positive obligation on the government to legalize same-sex marriage.

Civil unions

Background
Article 63(II) of the Constitution of Bolivia limits free unions (uniones libres or uniones de hecho) to opposite-sex couples.

In April 2012, Erica Claure, a member of the opposition coalition, the Plan Progress for Bolivia – National Convergence, introduced a bill in the Plurinational Legislative Assembly to legalize same-sex civil unions. Lawyer and LGBT activist Víctor Hugo Vidangos indicated that the bill would grant civil partners equal rights to married couples in terms of inheritance, social security, next of kin, labor law and health care benefits; "We are asking for civil rights, we do not touch religious issues because we are in a secular state", said Hugo Vidangos. The bill was sent to the Human Rights Commission of the Chamber of Deputies for study. It was opposed by the Catholic Church and several members of the Movement for Socialism (MAS). In May 2012, the president of the Chamber of Deputies, Rebecca Delgado, said that the Constitution of Bolivia recognises only unions "between a man and a woman", and the president of the Plural Justice Commission of the Chamber of Deputies, Juan Carlos Cejas, said that the bill was probably unconstitutional. In August 2012, Senator Hilda Saavedra from the governing MAS party introduced another civil union bill, citing Article 14(II) of the Bolivian Constitution which prohibits discrimination on the basis of sexual orientation. Both measures were tabled. Saavedra presented another bill in September 2013.

In July 2014, Public Advocate Rolando Villena called for same-sex unions to be included in the country's new Family Code. On 16 October 2014, the Chamber of Senators passed a revised family code that removed gender-specific terms. Activists had hoped that this would lead to same-sex couples being granted many of the same rights as heterosexual couples. The code was approved in the Chamber of Deputies, and was enacted in August 2015. The new Family Code made no mention of gender, but it was clarified that it had no legal weight to apply to same-sex couples. Article 147 states that free unions and marriages are valid "provided they meet the conditions established in the Political Constitution".

In April 2015, Vice President Álvaro García Linera stated that a discussion on the legalisation of same-sex unions would happen "sooner rather than later". This statement was followed by the president of the Chamber of Senators, José Alberto Gonzales, announcing his support for discussing the issue: "If they love each other, what is the [problem]?".

Due to Article 63 of the Political Constitution, LGBT activists have instead begun pushing for a "Family Life Agreement" (Acuerdo de Vida en Familia), a legal institution separate from marriage or free unions but offering similar legal rights. On 21 September 2015, an LGBT advocacy group, the Bolivian Coalition of LGBT Collectives (Coalibol; Coalición Boliviana de Colectivos LGBT), handed the Plurinational Legislative Assembly a bill to legalize same-sex unions under the term "Family Life Agreement". The proposal sought to grant same-sex couples the same rights as heterosexual couples with the exception of adoption. Citing a lack of process in the Assembly, Coalibol delivered the bill to Ombudsman David Tezanos Pinto in September 2016 who was asked to promote the bill in the Assembly. The group reintroduced its proposal in June 2017, again citing no legislative progress.

Recognition of free unions (2020–present)
On 5 October 2018, couple David Aruquipa Pérez and Guido Montaño Durán went to a Civil Registry Service (SERECI) office in La Paz seeking to formalise their 9-year-old relationship as a free union. The registry refused, alleging that the Political Constitution prevented the registration of same-sex unions. The couple filed an administrative appeal invoking violations of human rights and Article 256 of the Constitution. In September 2019, SERECI issued a resolution affirming the rejection, and on 10 February 2020 the couple filed a lawsuit in court. On 3 July 2020, the Second Constitutional Chamber of the La Paz Departmental Court of Justice, citing advisory opinion OC 24/7 issued by the Inter-American Court of Human Rights, ruled in favor of the couple. SERECI appealed the decision to the Constitutional Court. On 9 December 2020, SERECI reversed its position and issued "Resolution 003/2020", ordering the registration of the free union of Aruquipa Pérez and Montaño Durán. The couple finally registered their union on 18 December 2020. This decision sets a precedent for other same-sex couples to access this recognition in Bolivia. LGBT groups described the decision as "historic".

In May 2021, a SERECI office in La Paz refused to register the relationship of a lesbian couple. A lawyer representing the couple argued that this denial was contradictory to the registry's own resolution issued in December 2020. On 13 May 2022, the couple managed to register their free union after a year of waiting and bureaucratic procedures. On 27 May 2022, a third same-sex couple, Diego Figueroa and David Corchero, was able to formalize their free union by registering their relationship with the SERECI office in Santa Cruz de la Sierra, also after more than a year of waiting. On 7 October 2022, another couple officially registered their free union with the SERECI office in La Paz. The process lasted a month according to the couple. By January 2023, 16 same-sex couples had entered into a free union in Bolivia; 8 in Santa Cruz de la Sierra, 5 in La Paz, and 3 in Cochabamba.

Same-sex marriage
Article 63(I) of the Constitution of Bolivia states the following in relation to marriage:
 in Spanish: 
 in Quechua: 
 in Aymara: 
 in Guarani: 
 (Marriage between a woman and a man is formed by legal bond and is based on equality of the rights and duties of the spouses.)

In July 2010, following the legalisation of same-sex marriage in Argentina, Vice President Álvaro García Linera said that the Cabinet of Bolivia led by President Evo Morales had no plans to legalize same-sex marriage.

In 2013, constitutionalist Jose Antonio Rivera said he believed that "article 63 of the Constitution does not foresee a prohibition on marriages between people of the same sex; what it does is characterize the modalities of marriages between a man and a woman". Antonio Rivera stated that pursuant to Articles 14(II) and 66 of the Constitution, which prohibit discrimination on the basis of sexual orientation and recognise sexual freedom, same-sex couples should be able to marry in Bolivia, but that interpretation of the articles lays with the Plurinational Constitutional Court.

The new Family Code approved by the Legislative Assembly in 2014 is written in gender-neutral terminology, However, article 147 states that marriages and free unions are valid "provided they meet the conditions established in the Political Constitution".

2018 Inter-American Court of Human Rights ruling
On 9 January 2018, in advisory opinion OC 24/7, the Inter-American Court of Human Rights (IACHR) ruled that countries signatory to the American Convention on Human Rights are required to allow same-sex couples to marry. The ruling states that:

Bolivia ratified the American Convention on Human Rights on 19 July 1979 and recognized the court's jurisdiction on 27 July 1993. The ruling sets binding precedent for Bolivian courts. Human rights activists believe Bolivia is now required to legalise same-sex marriage under Article 256 of the Political Constitution:

Public opinion
According to a Pew Research Center survey conducted between 7 November 2013 and 13 February 2014, 22% of Bolivians supported same-sex marriage and 67% were opposed.

A poll conducted in June 2015 by newspaper Página Siete found that 74% of Bolivians opposed same-sex marriage.

The 2017 AmericasBarometer showed that 35% of Bolivians supported same-sex marriage.

See also 
 LGBT rights in Bolivia
 Recognition of same-sex unions in the Americas

References

External links
 Bolivia (Plurinational State of)'s Constitution of 2009

LGBT rights in Bolivia
Bolivia